The 52nd Annual Tony Awards ceremony was held on June 7, 1998, at Radio City Music Hall and was broadcast by CBS television. A documentaries segment was telecast on PBS television. The ceremony was hosted by Rosie O'Donnell, who hosted a total of three times (1997, 1998, and 2000).

This ceremony is notable for its Best Direction of a Play and Best Direction of a Musical winners both being female, the first time a female has won either award. The writer of the Best Play winner was also female, the second female winner of the award.

The Lion Kings six wins, including Best Musical, made it the first franchise to complete EGOT status. Ragtime had 13 nominations, the most of the night, and  Ragtime, The Beauty Queen of Leenane and Cabaret each won four Tonys.

The ceremony
The opening number was "Broadway Divas", with Rosie O'Donnell and the Chicago dancers introducing: Patti LuPone ("Don't Cry for Me Argentina" from Evita); Jennifer Holliday ("And I Am Telling You I'm Not Going" from Dreamgirls); and Betty Buckley ("Memory" from Cats).

Musicals represented:
 Ragtime ("Ragtime" – Marin Mazzie, Audra McDonald and Company)
 The Sound of Music ("Wedding"/"Do-Re-Mi"/"The Sound of Music" Finale – Rebecca Luker and Company)
 1776 ("Sit Down, John" – Richard Poe and Company)
 The Lion King ("Circle of Life" – Tsidii Le Loka and Company)
 Cabaret ("Willkommen" – Alan Cumming and Company)
 Side Show ("I Will Never Leave You" – Alice Ripley and Emily Skinner)
 The Scarlet Pimpernel ("Into the Fire" – Douglas Sills and Company)

Winners and nominees
Winners are in bold

Special awards
 Regional Theater Tony AwardDenver Center Theatre Company Lifetime Achievement in the Theatre
 Ben Edwards Edward E. Colton Tony Honor Winner
 The International Theatre Institute of the United States'''

Multiple nominations and awards

These productions had multiple nominations:13 nominations: Ragtime 11 nominations: The Lion King10 nominations: Cabaret 6 nominations: The Beauty Queen of Leenane and The Chairs 4 nominations: Side Show and A View from the Bridge 3 nominations: Art, The Capeman, Golden Child, The Scarlet Pimpernel and 1776   2 nominations: Ah, Wilderness!, The Diary of Anne Frank, Freak, High Society and Honour  

The following productions received multiple awards.6 wins: The Lion King 4 wins: The Beauty Queen of Leenane, Cabaret and Ragtime 2 wins: A View from the Bridge''

See also
 Drama Desk Awards
 1998 Laurence Olivier Awards – equivalent awards for West End theatre productions
 Obie Award
 New York Drama Critics' Circle
 Theatre World Award
 Lucille Lortel Awards

References

External links
 Tony Awards Official website

Tony Awards ceremonies
1998 in theatre
1998 theatre awards
Tony
1998 in New York City